Raspberries Capitol Collectors Series is a 1991 compilation of 20 tracks recorded by the band between 1972 and 1974. This release was the first time that many of these songs were available on compact disc. The CD contained two unlisted extra tracks which were recordings of radio spots used to promote the albums Fresh Raspberries and Starting Over. The compilation was also available on cassette. It has been out of print for several years.

Track listing

 Go All the Way
 Come Around And See Me
 I Saw The Light
 Don't Want To Say Goodbye
 I Wanna Be With You
 Let's Pretend
 I Reach For The Light
 Nobody Knows
 If You Change Your Mind
 Drivin' Around
 Tonight
 Last Dance
 Hard To Get Over A Heartbreak
 I'm A Rocker
 Ecstasy
 Overnight Sensation
 Party's Over
 Rose Coloured Glasses
 Cruisin' Music
 Starting Over
 Promo Spot #1 (CD only)
 Promo Spot #2 (CD only)

Tracks 1 - 4 from Raspberries.
Tracks 5 - 10 from Fresh Raspberries.
Tracks 11 - 15 from Side 3.
Tracks 16 - 20 from Starting Over.

Raspberries (band) albums
Albums produced by Jimmy Ienner
Capitol Records compilation albums
1991 compilation albums